Alfei Jürgenson (8 April 1904 – 22 August 1947) was an Estonian professional footballer who played as a striker for the Estonian national football team.

Career
He participated in the 1924 Paris Olympic Games with the Estonian football team. In 1924 until 1930, he played for JK Tallinn and played four games for Estonia.

References

1904 births
1947 deaths
Estonian footballers
Olympic footballers of Estonia
Footballers at the 1924 Summer Olympics
Association football forwards
Estonia international footballers